Qeshlaq Amir Khanlu-ye Hajji Tapduq (also Romanized as Qeshlāq Amīr Khānlū-ye Ḩājjī Tāpdūq; also known as Qeshlāq Amīr Khānlū-ye Ḩājj Tāpdūq) is a village in Mahmudabad Rural District, Tazeh Kand District, Parsabad County, Ardabil Province, Iran. At the 2006 census, its population was 798, in 168 families.

References 

Towns and villages in Parsabad County